Aaron Lieberman is an American politician who served as an Arizona State Representative for the 28th district from 2019 to 2021. A member of the Democratic Party, he resigned from office to run for Governor of Arizona in 2022.

Early life, education, and career 
Aaron was born in Tempe, Arizona, and raised in Phoenix. He studied at Yale University before founding Jumpstart, an education nonprofit, and Acelero Learning. In 2015, Lieberman returned to Arizona, becoming a philanthropist and the CEO of a surgery center in Phoenix.

Politics 
During the 2018 elections, Lieberman defeated incumbent Republican State Representative Maria Syms in Arizona's 28th legislative district, a Phoenix-area seat.

2022 Arizona gubernatorial election 
In June 2021, Lieberman announced that he would run for Governor of Arizona in next year's election. He resigned from the House in September. Throughout the campaign, Lieberman trailed fellow candidate Katie Hobbs. He dropped out of the race on May 27, 2022, pledging to support a Democratic candidate.

References

External links
Campaign website

Year of birth missing (living people)
Living people
Yale University alumni
Democratic Party members of the Arizona House of Representatives
21st-century American politicians